Antalieptė is a small town in Zarasai district municipality, near the Duseta–Daugailiai road and the right bank of the Šventoji riverhead. The town is also 4 km from the village of Zabičiūnai.

Antalieptė has a secondary school and post office (postode: LT-32013). In Šventoji valley there is the Antalieptė Cross Discovery church, also there was Antalieptė Discalced Carmelites monastery. Antalieptė also has House of Culture, library (from 1941) and a water mill (built 1855 from broken and round rocks, red bricks and lime; mill was working until 1966).

History
According to the 1897 census, 85.5% of the population of the town was Jewish. The Jews immigrated before World War II or were murdered during the Holocaust in Nazi occupied Lithuania by both Germans and Lithuanians.

References

Towns in Lithuania
Towns in Utena County
Novoalexandrovsky Uyezd
Holocaust locations in Lithuania
Zarasai District Municipality